Jerry Farnsworth (1895–1983) was an American artist. He was born in Dalton, Georgia and studied at the Corcoran School of Art under Charles W. Hawthorne. During 1942 and 1943 he was the Artist-in-Residence at the University of Illinois. Farnsworth also worked in a soda dispensing drug store, as a Fuller Brush Man, as a Western Union messenger boy, and in a cotton mill and steel mill.

Farnsworth's awards include six from the National Academy of Design (1941), one from the National Arts Club (1941), one from the Los Angeles County Museum of Art (1945) and one from Grand Central Galleries (1928). Farnsworth belonged to the National Arts Club, an Academician of the National Academy of Design, the Salmagundi Club, Washington Society of Art and the Provincetown Art Association. Painter Helen Alton Sawyer was his wife and they operated a summer art school in Truro, Massachusetts. They wintered in Sarasota, Florida.

His work was exhibited at the Pennsylvania Academy of Fine Arts, the Museum of Modern Art and the Whitney Museum of American Art.

He wrote Painting with Jerry Farnsworth, Learning to Paint in Oil and Portrait and Figure Painting. Some of his papers are collected at Syracuse University.

He married fellow artist Helen Alton Sawyer (1900-1999).

References

External links
Oral history interview with Jerry Farnsworth and Helen Sawyer, 1972 Sept. 21 Archives of American Art, Smithsonian

1895 births
1983 deaths
20th-century American painters
American male painters
People from Dalton, Georgia
Painters from Georgia (U.S. state)
Corcoran School of the Arts and Design alumni
University of Illinois Urbana-Champaign faculty